The March (also margraviate or marquisate) of Montferrat was a frontier march of the Kingdom of Italy during the Middle Ages and a state of the Holy Roman Empire. The margraviate was raised to become the Duchy of Montferrat in 1574.

Originally part of the March of Western Liguria (Marca Liguriae Occidentalis) established by King Berengar II about 950, the area of Montferrat was constituted as the marca Aleramica ("Aleramic march") for his son-in-law Aleramo. The earliest secure documentation of Aleramo and his immediate family is derived from the founding charter of the Abbey of Grazzano in 961. occasioned by the recent death of Aleramo's son Gugliemo.

After King Otto I of Germany had invaded Italy in 961 and displaced Berengar II, he began, in a manner much like his predecessors Berengar and Hugh of Arles, to redefine the great fiefs of Italy. He reorganised the northwest into three great marches. Western Liguria he restored to Aleramo, Eastern Liguria or the marca Januensis he gave to Oberto I, and Turin he made a march for Arduin Glaber.

Aleram's descendants were relatively obscure until the time of Marquess Rainier in the early twelfth century. About 1133 Rainier's son Marquess William V married Judith of Babenberg, a half-sister of King Conrad III of Germany, and so greatly increased his family's prestige. He entered into the Italian policies of Conrad and the Byzantine Emperor Manuel I Komnenos, setting a Ghibelline precedent for his successors, and with his sons became involved in the Crusades.

Marquess Boniface I was the leader of the Fourth Crusade and established the Kingdom of Thessalonica in the Latin Empire of Greece. Reuniting Thessalonica, inherited by Boniface's Greek son Demetrius, with Montferrat became a goal of Boniface's Italian heirs, though nothing ever came of their endeavours.

In the thirteenth century, Montferrat waffled between the Guelph and Ghibelline parties under Boniface II and William VII. It had to wage several long wars against the independence-minded communes of Asti and Alessandria and it became the standard-bearers of a renewed Lombard League forged to fight the spread of Angevin influence into northern Italy. The capital of Montferrat at this time was Chivasso, the centre of the margraves' power.

In 1305, the last Aleramici margrave died and Montferrat was inherited by the Greek imperial Palaiologos dynasty, who held it until 1533, during a period of diminishing territoriality. In that year, Montferrat was seized by the Spanish under Emperor Charles V of Habsburg, who restored it to Federico II, Duke of Mantua from the House of Gonzaga in 1536. His son Margrave William X was elevated to a Duke of Montferrat in 1574 and the "march" ceased to exist as an entity, though it had already undergone the significant change from a feudal collection of frontier counties to one of the petty states of Renaissance Italy, divided into two separated territories.

See also
 List of rulers of Montferrat, for a list of margraves and dukes
 Iudiciaria Torrensis
 Duchy of Montferrat

Sources
 
 

 
Monferrato
1574 disestablishments
Montferrat
Montferrat
States and territories established in the 960s
961 establishments